Aalitaal is a Gaupalika in Dadeldhura District in the Sudurpashchim Province of far-western Nepal. 
Aalitaal has a population of 18531.The land area is 292.87 km2.

References

Rural municipalities in Dadeldhura District
Rural municipalities of Nepal established in 2017